Sarracenia purpurea, the purple pitcher plant, northern pitcher plant, turtle socks, or side-saddle flower, is a carnivorous plant in the family Sarraceniaceae.

Description
Like other species of Sarracenia, S. purpurea obtains most of its nutrients through prey capture. However, prey acquisition is said to be inefficient, with less than 1% of the visiting prey captured within the pitcher. Even so, anecdotal evidence by growers often shows that pitchers quickly fill up with prey during the warm summer months. Prey fall into the pitcher and drown in the rainwater that collects in the base of each leaf.

Prey items, such as flies, ants, spiders, and even moths or hornets, are then digested by an invertebrate community, made up mostly by the mosquito Wyeomyia smithii and the midge Metriocnemus knabi. The relationship between W. smithii and S. purpurea is an example of commensalism.

S. purpurea also traps juvenile spotted salamanders with enough regularity that nearly 20% of surveyed plants were found to contain one or more salamanders in a 2019 study. The salamanders were observed to die within three to nineteen days, and may be killed as the small pools of water in the plant are heated by the sun. A single salamander could provide hundreds to thousands of times the nutrients of invertebrate prey, but it is not known how efficiently S. purpurea is able to digest them.

Protists, rotifers (including Habrotrocha rosa), and bacteria form the base of inquiline food web that shreds and mineralizes available prey, making nutrients available to the plant. New pitcher leaves do produce digestive enzymes such as hydrolases and proteases, but as the individual leaves get older into their second year, digestion of prey material is aided by the community of bacteria that live within the pitchers.

Distribution
Species of Sarracenia grow in nutrient-poor, acid bogs. Its range includes the Eastern seaboard, the Great Lakes region, all of Canada (except Nunavut and Yukon), Washington state, and Alaska. That makes it the most common and broadly distributed pitcher plant, as well as the only member of the genus that inhabits cold temperate climates. How the Sarracenia traveled so far is still a mystery. From what is known so far the Sarracenia has a median seed dispersal distance of 5cm, which is not far enough to explain the plant’s widespread occurrence throughout North America. It is endangered or vulnerable over much of the southern part of its range. The species is the floral emblem of the Canadian province of Newfoundland and Labrador. Most varieties along the Gulf Coast of the United States that were once identified as Sarracenia purpurea have since been reclassified as Sarracenia rosea.

It is an introduced and naturalized species in Europe and the northwestern US. It is found in habitats of the native carnivorous species Darlingtonia californica, in the Klamath Mountains and northern Sierra Nevada. The plant has also been recorded in Washington state, Austria, the Czech Republic, Denmark, France, Germany, Ireland, Sweden, Switzerland, and the United Kingdom. In Britain and Ireland purple pitcher plant have invaded heather-rich peatbogs in Britain and Ireland and with the mild climate can grow in large numbers at the expense of local flora. Peatbogs are also under threat as the Sphagnum mosses do not grow near the pitcher plant.

Taxonomy
The species is further divided into two subspecies, S. purpurea subsp. purpurea and S. purpurea subsp. venosa. The former is found from New Jersey north, while the latter is found from New Jersey south and tolerates warmer temperatures.

In 1999, Sarracenia purpurea subsp. venosa var. burkii was described as a species of its own: Sarracenia rosea. This re-ranking has been debated among carnivorous plant enthusiasts since then, but further morphological evidence has supported the split. The following species and infraspecific taxa are usually recognized:

Sarracenia purpurea subsp. purpurea
Sarracenia purpurea subsp. purpurea f. heterophylla
Sarracenia purpurea subsp. purpurea f. ruplicola (invalid)
Sarracenia purpurea subsp. venosa
Sarracenia purpurea subsp. venosa var. burkii [=S. rosea]
Sarracenia purpurea subsp. venosa var. burkii f. luteola
Sarracenia purpurea subsp. venosa var. montana

Uses

Ornamental
Sarracenia purpurea is cultivated as an ornamental plant. It is fairly hardy, but requires a reliably damp soil in a sheltered position, with full or partial sunlight. The subspecies S. purpurea ssp. purpurea has received the Royal Horticultural Society's Award of Garden Merit.

Medicinal
It was used as a medicinal plant by Native American and First Nation tribes in its northeastern and Great Lakes distribution ranges, including the Algonquin, Cree, Iroquois, Mi'kmaq (Micmac) peoples, primarily for use in treating smallpox by means of a root infusion. A 2012 study suggests Sarracenia purpurea is effective as a treatment for viruses in the Orthopoxvirus family, including the smallpox virus, through inhibition of early virus transcription.

Biocontrol
Sarracenia purpurea pitchers have been investigated as a biocontrol for the Asian Hornet Vespa velutina in Europe, as they act as natural bottle traps in which hornets have been observed to be trapped in. The hybrids used in the study, S. juthatipsoper and S. evendine, were deemed too unselective, but the researchers proposed trying other pitcher plant species which may be more effective.

References

External links
Sarracenia purpurea at Barry Rice's carnivorous plant FAQ.
Botanical Society of America, Sarracenia - the Pitcher Plants
UC Photos gallery — Sarracenia purpurea

purpurea
Carnivorous plants of North America
Taxa named by Carl Linnaeus
Plants described in 1753
Plants used in traditional Native American medicine
Provincial symbols of Newfoundland and Labrador